The UK singles chart was first published in 1952. It is currently compiled by the Official Charts Company (OCC). To qualify for entry on this list of artists who have reached number one in the chart since its inception, the artist in question must have been individually credited as an artist on four or more number one singles. Simply playing or singing on a single is not counted (for example as part of a group or supergroup), so, for example Clem Cattini, a prolific session musician who has played on over 40 number ones, is not included. Also not included are The Jordanaires, who were credited on 11 number ones with Elvis Presley between 1957 and 1963 by The Virgin Book of British Hit Singles (who based their data on the record's label info and the catalogue numbers of the chart hit) but not currently by the OCC. Unlike The Shadows, who had 7 number ones backing Cliff Richard (including one using their original name, the Drifters), The Jordanaires never charted in their own right and so did not get their own entry in the OCC database. In addition, the OCC's database fails to credit JLS and One Direction as featured artists on The X Factor contestants' cover of "Wishing on a Star", giving the former act 5 number ones and the latter 4 number ones according to their information (though this featured credit is on the single's cover and CD's label).

Elvis Presley has 21 number ones on the UK Singles Chart, including three re-releases which are counted as separate chart entries/chart hits due to the records' catalogue numbers changing in 2005. With or without the releases, Presley's total is still more than any other artist in history. The Beatles hold the record for the most number-ones singles by a group (with 17), while Madonna holds the record for a female artist (with 13).

Artists by number of UK Singles Chart number ones

Twenty one

Seventeen

Fourteen

Thirteen

Twelve

Ten

Nine

Eight

Seven

Six

Five

Four

See also
 List of artists by number of UK Albums Chart number ones
 List of artists who reached number one on the UK Singles Chart

Notes
Asterisks indicate chains of consecutive hits following a debut number one.

References

UK number one